John Thomas Smith is the name of:
 John Thomas Smith (engraver) (1766–1833), also known as Antiquity Smith, British painter, engraver and antiquarian
 John Smith (Victoria politician) (1816–1879), Australian politician and mayor of Melbourne
J. T. Smith (American football) (born 1955), former professional American football player